Hypotrachyna taylorensis is a species of foliose lichen in the family Parmeliaceae. Described by M.E. Mitchell in 1961, and transferred to genus Hypotrachyna by Mason Hale in 1975, the lichen occurs in the Appalachian region of North America.

References

taylorensis
Lichen species
Lichens described in 1961
Lichens of North America